Charles William Flood (18 July 1896 – 14 November 1978) was an English footballer and first-class cricketer.

Flood played football for Plymouth Argyle, Hull City, Bolton Wanderers, Nottingham Forest, York City and Swindon Town.
 
During the 1920s, he played cricket for Hull, though his service with them was frequently interrupted by his football commitments.

He later played cricket with Sir Julien Cahn's XI in various matches from 1929 to 1937 and for the Combined Services in 1943. A wicket-keeper, he toured South America in the winter of 1929–30 with Cahn's XI. He was born in Newport, Isle of Wight and died in Beverley, Yorkshire.

References

1896 births
1978 deaths
English footballers
Association football forwards
Plymouth Argyle F.C. players
Hull City A.F.C. players
Bolton Wanderers F.C. players
Nottingham Forest F.C. players
York City F.C. players
Swindon Town F.C. players
Southern Football League players
English Football League players
Midland Football League players
English cricketers of 1919 to 1945
Sir Julien Cahn's XI cricketers